Sir John Melville FRSE WS (1802 – 5 May 1860) was a Scottish lawyer and landowner who served as Lord Provost of Edinburgh from 1854 to 1859. Melville Drive in Edinburgh is named after him.

Life

He was born in Kirkcaldy in Fife the son of Isabella Rule of Kennoway and her husband, George Melville, a lawyer. The family moved to Edinburgh in his youth, residing first at 5 Broughton Place then 3 Nelson Street nearby. He studied law at the University of Edinburgh.

He was apprenticed to Alexander Manners WS based at 12 Nicolson Square. He qualified WS in 1827 and set up his own partnership Melville & Lindesay WS.

In 1849 he was Chief Magistrate of Edinburgh. He was also created a town councillor in 1853.

In 1857 he was elected a Fellow of the Royal Society of Edinburgh.

Melville was knighted in 1859 by Queen Victoria at the end of his period as Lord Provost.

He died at home 15 Heriot Row on 5 May 1860. He is buried in Newington Cemetery in the south of the city, and is also commemorated on his parents' gravestone in East Preston Street Burial Ground.

Family
In 1838 he married Jane Marshall (1801 - 7 Feb 1873) sister of David Marshall, a prominent Edinburgh accountant. His son, George Fisher Melville (21 May 1841 - 12 July 1917), was an advocate.

Artistic recognition
His portrait by James Edgar was painted (in his official robes) in 1859. It is held by the City of Edinburgh Council and is rarely displayed.

References

1802 births
1860 deaths
People from Kirkcaldy
Alumni of the University of Edinburgh
Scottish solicitors
Lord Provosts of Edinburgh
Fellows of the Royal Society of Edinburgh
Scottish landowners
19th-century Scottish businesspeople